Brignoli is an Italian surname. Notable people with the surname include:

Alberto Brignoli (born 1991), Italian footballer
Ermanno Brignoli (born 1969), Italian cyclist
Luca Brignoli (born 1983), Italian footballer
Paolo Brignoli (1942–1986), Italian entomologist
Pasquale Brignoli (1824–1884), Italian-born American opera singer

Italian-language surnames